Samuel Simons Sanford (15 March 18496 January 1910) was an American pianist and educator.

Early life
He was born in Bridgeport, Connecticut.

Education
He studied piano in New York with William Mason (son of Lowell Mason and student of Franz Liszt and Ignaz Moscheles).  He went to Paris and studied with Alfred Jaëll, Louis Plaidy (teacher of Hans von Bülow and many others), Théodore Ritter (another student of Liszt), and Édouard Batiste.  In 1869, he became acquainted with Anton Rubinstein, and later studied with him.

Career
He travelled with Rubinstein during his first American tour in 1872–73. Ignacy Jan Paderewski changed his execution of octave playing after hearing Sanford play, and once described Sanford as the most musically gifted person he ever knew.

Sanford brought Sir Edward Elgar's music to American attention through the brothers Walter and Frank Damrosch and Theodore Thomas.  He was instrumental in having Elgar awarded an honorary doctorate in music from Yale University in 1905; at the conferral ceremony on 28 June, Elgar's Pomp and Circumstance March No. 1 was played, instituting the tradition of playing noble processional music at graduation ceremonies.  Later that year, Elgar returned the compliment by dedicating his Introduction and Allegro to Sanford.

Sanford joined the Yale Music Faculty as Professor of Applied Music in 1894, along with Horatio Parker as Professor of Theory. During the sixteen years he worked at Yale, he refused to be paid any salary as he was independently wealthy.

He died at home on 6 January 1910 after a long illness.

Sanford Medal
In 1972 Yale University instituted the Samuel Simons Sanford Medal (usually referred to as the Sanford Medal), to honour celebrated concert artists and distinguished members of the music profession.   Recipients have included:
 1972: Eugene Ormandy
 1975: Doriot Anthony Dwyer
 1983: Louis Krasner
 1983: Maureen Forrester
 1991: Richard F. French
 1997: Dorothy DeLay
 1999: Keith Wilson
 2000: H.M. King Bhumibol Adulyadej of Thailand
 2002: Lili Chookasian
 2003: Andrew Litton
 2005: Robert Blocker
 2005: Richard Stoltzman
 2010: Vivian Perlis
 2012: Joseph W. Polisi
 2013: Willie Ruff
 2013: Peter Gelb
 2015: Klaus Heymann
 2015: Yo-Yo Ma
 Emanuel Ax, Pierre Boulez, Alfred Brendel, Aaron Copland, Richard Goode, Marilyn Horne, Sherrill Milnes, Mstislav Rostropovich, Robert Shaw, Sir Georg Solti, Isaac Stern, Randall Thompson, and Virgil Thomson.

Notes

Sources
 World-Renowned Clarinetist Richard Stoltzman was Presented Prestigious Sanford Medal by Yale School of Music on Thursday, September 1, 2005

1849 births
1910 deaths
Musicians from Bridgeport, Connecticut
American classical pianists
Male classical pianists
American male pianists
American music educators
Edward Elgar
Yale University faculty
19th-century classical pianists
19th-century American pianists
19th-century American male musicians